Lieutenant Marcus McDilda was an American P-51 fighter pilot who was shot down over Osaka and captured by the Japanese on 8 August 1945, two days after the atomic bombing of Hiroshima.

Capture and confession 
After his capture, McDilda was paraded through the streets of Osaka, where he was blindfolded and beaten by civilians. He was then interrogated by the Kempeitai, the Japanese military police, who tortured McDilda in order to discover how many atomic bombs the Allies had and what the future targets were. McDilda, who knew nothing about the atomic bomb nor the Manhattan Project, initially admitted that he knew nothing about the atomic bombs, but, after a Japanese officer threatened to kill him, McDilda "confessed" that the U.S. had 100 atomic bombs that would be dropped on Tokyo and Kyoto, the only Japanese cities he knew the names of, within "the next few days". McDilda's "testimony" included the following nonsense description of the science behind the A-bomb:

This "confession" led the Japanese to consider McDilda a "Very Important Person" and he was flown to Tokyo the next morning, where he was interrogated by a civilian scientist, who was a graduate of the City College of New York. The interrogator quickly realized McDilda knew nothing of nuclear fission and was giving fake testimony. McDilda explained that he had told his Osaka questioners that he knew nothing, but when that was not accepted, he had to "tell the lie to stay alive". McDilda was taken to a cell and fed, and awaited his fate; but he was rescued from the Ōmori POW camp nineteen days later, after it was captured by the 4th Marine Regiment. The move to Tokyo had probably saved McDilda's life; after the announcement of the Japanese surrender, fifty U.S. soldiers imprisoned in Osaka were executed by Japanese soldiers.

This case has brought into question the effectiveness of torture, as the "confession" might have been counterproductive to Japan's intelligence-gathering.

References

Surrender of Japan
Atomic bombings of Hiroshima and Nagasaki
American prisoners of war in World War II
World War II prisoners of war held by Japan
American torture victims
Torture in Japan
American World War II fighter pilots
United States Army Air Forces pilots of World War II
Shot-down aviators
United States military in Japan
Year of birth missing
Place of birth missing
Year of death missing
Place of death missing